Aaron Solomon was a Jewish merchant of Philadelphia, who, about 1777, signed an agreement to take the colonial paper currency sanctioned by King George III in place of gold and silver. He left Philadelphia for Europe in 1785.

References
 

18th-century American people
Businesspeople from Philadelphia
American Jews
American merchants
18th-century births
Year of death missing
People of colonial Pennsylvania